Sir Christopher Richard Watkin Edwards   (born 12 February 1942) is a former Vice-Chancellor of Newcastle University.

Career
Educated at Marlborough College and Christ's College, Cambridge, Edwards became senior lecturer in medicine at St Bartholomew's Hospital in London in 1975, Professor of Medicine at the University of Edinburgh in 1980 and Dean of the Faculty of Medicine at the University of Edinburgh in 1991. He was appointed the first Principal of the Imperial College School of Medicine in 1995 before becoming Vice-Chancellor of Newcastle University in 2001.

After retiring from Newcastle University in 2007 he became Chairman of the Chelsea & Westminster NHS Foundation Trust. Since 2012 he has also been a trustee at the Planet Earth Institute.

He was appointed a knight bachelor in the 2008 Birthday Honours.

References

Living people
1942 births
People from Banbury
People educated at Marlborough College
Alumni of Christ's College, Cambridge
Academics of the University of Edinburgh
Academics of Imperial College London
Vice-Chancellors of Newcastle University
Knights Bachelor